"The Princess and the Pea" (direct translation: "The Princess on the Pea") is a literary fairy tale by Hans Christian Andersen about a young woman whose royal ancestry is established by a test of her sensitivity. The tale was first published with three others by Andersen in an inexpensive booklet on 8 May 1835 in Copenhagen by C. A. Reitzel.

The tale is classified in the Aarne–Thompson–Uther Index as ATU 704, "The Princess and the Pea".

Plot
The story tells of a prince who wants to marry a princess but is having difficulty finding a suitable wife. Something is always wrong with those he meets and he cannot be certain they are real princesses because they have bad table manners or they are not his type. One stormy night, a young woman drenched with rain seeks shelter in the prince's castle. She claims to be a princess, but no one believes her because of the way she looks. The prince's mother decides to test their unexpected guest by placing a pea in the bed she is offered for the night, covered by twenty mattresses and twenty eider-down beds on top of the mattresses.

In the morning, the princess tells her hosts that she endured a sleepless night, kept awake by something hard in the bed that she is certain has bruised her. With the proof of her bruised back, the princess passes the test and the prince rejoices happily, for only a real princess would have the sensitivity to feel a pea through such a quantity of bedding. The two are happily married, and the story ends with the pea being placed in a museum, where, according to the story, it can still be seen today unless someone has stolen it.

Commentaries
Researcher Jack Zipes said that Andersen, during his lifetime, "was obliged to act as a dominated subject within the dominant social circles despite his fame and recognition as a writer"; Andersen, therefore, developed a feared and loved the view of the aristocracy. Others have said that Andersen constantly felt as though he did not belong, and longed to be a part of the upper class.

While a 1905 article in the American Journal of Education recommended the story for children aged 8–10, "The Princess and the Pea" was not uniformly well received by critics. Toksvig wrote in 1934, "[the story] seems to the reviewer not only indelicate but indefensible, in so far as the child might absorb the false idea that great ladies must always be so terribly thin-skinned."

“The Princess and the Pea” spurred on positive criticism, as well. In fact, critic Paul Hazard pointed out the realistic aspects of the fairy tale that make it easily relatable to all people. He believed that "the world Andersen witnessed—which encompassed sorrow, death, evil and man's follies—is reflected in his tales," and most evidently in "The Princess and the Pea." Another scholar, Niels Kofoed, noticed that “since they involve everyday-life themes of love, death, nature, injustice, suffering and poverty, they appeal to all races, ideologies, classes and genders.” Moreover, Celia Catlett Anderson realized that one of the things that makes this story so appealing and relatable is that optimism prevails over pessimism, especially for the main character of the princess. This inspires hope in the readers for their own futures and strength within themselves.

Adaptations
In 1927, German composer Ernst Toch published an opera based on "The Princess and the Pea", with a libretto by Benno Elkan. Reportedly this opera was very popular in the American student repertoires; the music, as well as the English translation (by Marion Farquhar), were praised in a review in Notes. The story was adapted to the musical stage in 1959 as Once Upon a Mattress, with comedian Carol Burnett playing the play's heroine, Princess Winnifred the Woebegone. The musical was revived in 1997 with Sarah Jessica Parker in the role. A television adaptation of "The Princess and the Pea" starred Liza Minnelli in a  Faerie Tale Theatre episode in 1984. The story has been adapted into three films, a six-minute IMAX production in 2001, one full-length animation film in 2002 and the 2005 feature-length movie featuring Carol Burnett and Zooey Deschanel. The tale was the basis for a story in The Stinky Cheese Man and Other Fairly Stupid Tales by Jon Scieszka and Lane Smith, wherein the prince decides to slip a bowling ball underneath one hundred mattresses after three years of unsuccessful attempts with the pea. In the morning, the princess comes downstairs and tells the queen, "This might sound odd but I think you need another mattress. I felt like I was sleeping on a lump as big as a bowling ball." satisfying the king and the queen. The princess marries the prince and they live happily, though maybe not entirely honestly, ever after. American poet Jane Shore published a poem, "The Princess and the Pea", in the January 1973 issue of Poetry, in which a close dependency between princess and pea is posited: "I lie in my skin as in an ugly coat: / my body owned by the citizens / who ache and turn whenever I turn / on the pea on which so much depends" (13-16). Russian writer Evgeny Shvarts incorporates the story, with two other Andersen stories, in his Naked King. In 2019, Simon Hood published a contemporary version of the story with animated illustrations. Both the language and the illustrations modernised the story, while the plot itself remained close to traditional versions.

Similar tales

A few folk tales feature a boy discovering a pea or a bean assumed to be of great value. After the boy enters a castle and is given a bed of straw for the night he tosses and turns in his sleep, attempting to guard his treasure. Some observers are persuaded that the boy is restless because he is unaccustomed to sleeping on straw and is therefore of aristocratic blood. In the more popular versions of the tale, only one pea is used. However, Charles Boner added in two more peas in his translation of the story upon which Andersen based his tale. Other differences amongst versions can be seen in various numbers of mattresses as well as feather beds. Versions of the story differ based on whether or not the character of the helper is included. The helper, in some cases, tells the princess to pretend she slept badly. In other versions, the helper does not appear at all and the princess decides to lie all on her own.

References

Citations

Bibliography

Further reading
 Bataller Català, Alexandre. (2018). «La princesa i el pèsol» (ATU 704): de les reescriptures escolars a la construcció identitària. Estudis de Literatura Oral Popular / Studies in Oral Folk Literature. 27. 10.17345/elop201827-46.
 Shojaei Kawan, Christine. (2005). The Princess on the Pea: Andersen, Grimm and the Orient. Fabula. 46. 89-115. 10.1515/fabl.2005.46.1-2.89.

External links

 "Prindsessen på Ærten" Original Danish text 2008 archive
 "The Princess on the Pea" English translation by Jean Hersholt
 Archived audio version of the story
 

Danish fairy tales
1835 short stories
Female characters in fairy tales
Fictional princesses
Fictional princes
Short stories by Hans Christian Andersen
ATU 700-749